Sky was a Canadian R&B-influenced pop rock group from Montreal, Quebec.  The duo originally consisted of James Renald (1971 - 2018) and Antoine Sicotte (1972 - ), son of actor Gilbert Sicotte. Both were songwriters, producers and multi-instrumentalists, who met in 1992 at a music engineering school in Montreal. Anastasia (2000–2003) replaced James as the lead singer after he left, and Karl Wolf (2003–2005) was the last lead singer of the group.

History
Phase I
Their first EP was released on their own Phat Royale label in 1997. Managed by Lee Brown, both members co-wrote, co-produced and co-played every instrument on that record.  Quebec radio stations began playing their music and eventually 43 stations in that province had added their songs to their playlists.  Canada's MusiquePlus, the French equivalent to English-language MuchMusic, began playing the video for their song "America".

In February 1998, Sky signed a major-label record deal with EMI Music Canada.  With the recording sessions for their upcoming major-label debut, two world-famous producers, Peter Mokran (Maxwell, R. Kelly, Michael Jackson) and Euro-Syndicate Productions, were brought in for two recording sessions at Gallery Studios in New York and Metalworks Studios in Mississauga, Ontario.  Legendary guitar player Wah-Wah Watson was featured as a guest performer as well.

Piece of Paradise, the duo's major-label debut, was launched in 1999. The album debuted at number 6 on the Canadian album charts and reached platinum status in Canada. The group's debut single, "Some Kinda Wonderful", was released in 1998, gained international success, hitting number 4 on the Canadian Singles Chart and number 1 in Thailand.

The group's follow-up single "Love Song" was also a major hit in Canada reaching number 1 on the Canadian Singles Chart. This was followed by the next single "Push" and finally "All I Want".

Sky then signed a major deal with Arista Records in the U.S., United Kingdom and Japan. The label released a reworked version of Piece of Paradise on June 29, 1999, with two additional tracks, "Strange" and "Dreamin'". Those tracks were also added to the Canadian version of the album, and was re-released on June 1, 1999. In July 1999, Sky opened for Britney Spears on the Canadian leg of her ...Baby One More Time Tour. After promoting their album and a live performance at the 1999 MuchMusic Video Awards, Renald announced in 2000 that he was leaving the duo due to camera shyness. He wasn't present at the Juno Awards in which Sky won "Best New Group", which created an awkward moment as Antoine was the sole acceptor of the award.

Phase II
The quitting, Renald was replaced later that year by Anastasia Friedman from Montreal. Anastasia was a singer that Sicotte was originally going to use for a new duo named Nice in 1999, but the name Sky was retained.

The new pair would release their first single, "Superhero", in August 2000, and a full album, Travelling Infinity, in November. The single "You" was also released and reached number 1 in Canada. A remix for that video was made due to the high popularity and demand for it.

Phase III
In 2003 the third and last incarnation of Sky came about, as Anastasia was replaced by Lebanon native Karl Wolf. The group went through a label change with Sextant Records and  released a third album, Picture Perfect, that spawned the single "Dedication".

Shortly thereafter, Sky split up and Karl Wolf decided to go solo.

After Sky
Karl Wolf continues to record. He first released a single, "Butterflies" in late 2005, and followed it up with three independent solo albums, Face Behind the Face (2006), Bite the Bullet (2007) and Nightlife (2009) and a big number of singles, the most successful of which was "Africa".

Anastasia Friedman has since worked as a yoga instructor in Montreal.

Co-founding member Antoine Sicotte became a celebrity chef in Montreal, an author of cookbooks as well as hosting Le Cuisinier rebelle (The Rebel Cook), based on his 2009 cookbook of the same name.

After leaving Sky, James Renald continued his songwriting and producing career in Los Angeles, California, where he resided until 2017. He notably wrote and produced the Mandy Moore hit song "Cry" and worked on many other projects. On August 11, 2018, at the age of 47, James Renald committed suicide in Eastman, Quebec after he went missing the day prior. Renald had struggled with anxiety from a young age until his death.

Discography

Albums

Singles

Awards and recognition
 2000: winner, Juno Award for New Group of the Year

References

External links 
 MuchMusic Bio
 

Canadian pop music groups
Canadian contemporary R&B musical groups
English-language musical groups from Quebec
Juno Award for Breakthrough Group of the Year winners
Musical groups established in 1997
Musical groups disestablished in 2005
Musical groups from Montreal
1997 establishments in Quebec
2005 disestablishments in Quebec